Hu Sang (born 10 November 1988) is a Chinese actress best known for her roles in the films Fatal Invitation and The Resistance.

Career
In 2000 Hu Sang was admitted to the Beijing Dance Academy High School. In 2012 she graduated from Central Academy of Drama in Beijing. She first appeared in 2008 film Nǚ'ér chuán, playing the heroine Fragrance.

In 2010 Hu made an international debut as a supporting role "Mei" in Last Kung Fu Monk.

In 2011 Hu played the heroine in her first leading role in The Resistance.

In 2012 Hu appeared in the TV series Wànshuǐqiānshān fēngyǔ qíng.

Other works include Fatal Invitations, a horror thriller from 2011.

Filmography

Movies
Last Kung Fu Monk (2010)
The Resistance (2011)
Fatal Invitation (2011)

TV series
A Good Husband (2008)
Long Journey of Love (2012)
Fox Fairy (2013)
Flower Carve (2014)
Single Villa (2015)

References

External links

Dioudou Filmography (Chinese)

1988 births
Living people
21st-century Chinese actresses
Central Academy of Drama alumni
Chinese film actresses
Chinese television actresses